Rack or racks may refer to:

Storage and installation

 Amp rack, short for amplifier rack, a piece of furniture in which amplifiers are mounted
 Bicycle rack, a frame for storing bicycles when not in use
 Bustle rack, a type of storage bin mounted on armored fighting vehicles
 Drying rack, for hanging clothing to dry
 Firearm rack, for storing firearms
 Pallet racking, structural racks (usually steel) for storing palletised loads
 Rack (billiards), for placing billiard balls in their starting positions
 Roof rack, a system used to carry items on top of a car
 Standardized equipment racks
 19-inch rack and 23-inch rack, commonly used for computer, communications, and AV equipment
 Rack unit, equipment sizing measure
 International Standard Payload Rack, used in spaceflight
 Toast rack, a serving piece

Media 

 The Rack (album), debut album by Asphyx
The Rack (1915 film), an American silent drama film
The Rack (1956 film), a courtroom drama starring Paul Newman
 "Racks" (song), song by rapper Y. C.

People 

 Rack (Buffy the Vampire Slayer), fictitious character
 Edmund Rack (c.1735–1787), English writer
 Reinhard Rack (born 1945), Austrian politician
 Tom Rack, American actor

Transportation 

 Rack and pinion, a gear arrangement commonly used in vehicle steering
 Rack lift, an elevator which runs on vertical rails
 Rack railway, a train propelled using a toothed rail
 Rack, in horseriding, a quick, four-beat ambling gait
 Racks railway station, a former railway station in Dumfries and Galloway, Scotland

Other uses 

 Laboratory drying rack, a pegboard for hanging and draining glassware in a laboratory
 Rack, a climbing term for the set of equipment carried up a climb
 Rack (web server interface), a Web server interface for Ruby
 Racking, the transfer of a liquid (such as wine) from one container to another
 Racking focus, a photography technique
 Rack of lamb, a cut of lamb meat
 Racks and quandles, concepts in abstract algebra
 Rack (torture)
 Receptor for activated C kinase 1 (RACK1)

See also 
 RACK (disambiguation)
 Wrack (disambiguation)